Olympiadane is a mechanically interlocked molecule composed of five interlocking macrocycles that resembles the Olympic rings.  The molecule is a linear pentacatenane or a [5]catenane. It was synthesized and named by Fraser Stoddart and coworkers in 1994. The molecule was designed without any practical use in mind, although other catenanes may have possible application to the construction of a molecular computer.

See also
Olympicene

References

Molecular topology
Hexafluorophosphates
Supramolecular chemistry
Pyridinium compounds
Substances discovered in the 1990s